Benedict de Tscharner (18 July 1937 – 12 November 2019) was a Swiss writer and diplomat.

Publications
Profession ambassadeur : diplomate suisse en France (2002)
Johann Konrad Kern : homme d'État et diplomate (2005)
Giuseppe Motta : homme d'État suisse (2007)
Albert Gallatin : genevois au service des États-Unis d'Amérique (2008)
Soldats : diversité des destins d'hier et d'aujourd'hui (2010)
Suissesses dans le monde (with Laurence Deonna) (2010)
INTER GENTES : hommes d'État, diplomates, penseurs politiques (2012)

References

Ambassadors of Switzerland to France
21st-century Swiss writers
1937 births
2019 deaths
People from Emmental District
Swiss nobility
Benedict